Deccan Derby is an Indian Thoroughbred horse race held every year at the Hyderabad Race Club, Hyderabad, India.

The Race
The annual event, Deccan Derby is held here which attracts the best 3 year olds in the country and is always run on October 2.

References

Horse races